Berwick is a populated place in McHenry County, North Dakota, United States.

It is the nearest community to St. Anselm's Cemetery, Wrought-Iron Cross Site, or at least was the most salient when that historic site was listed on the National Register of Historic Places in 1989.

References

External links
 Berwick memories, 1911-1960 :Berwick School, July 2-3, 1977 from the Digital Horizons website

Former municipalities in North Dakota
Unincorporated communities in McHenry County, North Dakota
Unincorporated communities in North Dakota